Jack Hitila Opeloge is a Samoan weightlifter who has represented Samoa at the Pacific Games and Commonwealth Games.

Opeloge comes from a weightlifting family. His brother Niusila and his sister Ele both won gold at the 2010 Commonwealth Games, in New Delhi, while his brother Don Opeloge won silver at the 2018 Commonwealth Games.

At the 2019 Pacific Games in Apia he won a gold, silver and bronze medal in the 81 kg division. At the 2021 Oceania Weightlifting Championships he won gold in the 102 kg division. At the 2022 Oceania Online Cup he came second to his brother Don.

In 2022 he was one of six Samoan weightlifters to qualify for the 2022 Commonwealth Games. He won silver in the 109 kg division after the cancellation of the 102 kg division.

References

Living people
Samoan male weightlifters
Weightlifters at the 2022 Commonwealth Games
Commonwealth Games medallists in weightlifting
Commonwealth Games silver medallists for Samoa
21st-century Samoan people
Year of birth missing (living people)
Medallists at the 2022 Commonwealth Games